A Gathering of Old Men is a novel by Ernest J. Gaines published in 1983.

Set on a 1970s Louisiana cane farm, the novel addresses racial discrimination and a bond that cannot be usurped.

Plot summary

One afternoon, Candy Marshall, a white plantation owner, discovers that a white Cajun farmer, Beau Boutan, has been shot in the yard of a black man named Mathu. She enlists the help of seventeen other old black men by having them come to Mathu's yard, each with a shotgun and one empty number 5 shell. She and the men all claim to be responsible for the murder in an effort to protect the guilty party. Meanwhile, Sheriff Mapes arrives to the scene to arrest the real murderer, most likely Mathu (as he was the only black man who stood up against racism and the Boutans, and is capable of shooting a shotgun). The sheriff also wishes to keep Beau's father, Fix Boutan, from coming to lynch Mathu, who he presumes killed Beau. Meanwhile, Fix's son Gil, who happens to be a standout football player at LSU, arrives at his house to try to convince Fix not to go to Marshall to seek revenge.

Film adaptation

In 1987 Volker Schlöndorff, a famous German director, made a film, also titled  A Gathering of Old Men (aka Murder on the Bayou), which adheres closely to the novel. It stars Richard Widmark (as Sheriff Mapes), Louis Gossett Jr. (as Mathu), Holly Hunter (as Candy), Joe Seneca (as Clatoo), and Will Patton (as Lou Dimes).

Novels by Ernest J. Gaines
1983 American novels
Alfred A. Knopf books
Novels set in Louisiana
Novels about racism
Fiction set in the 1970s
American novels adapted into films
African-American novels

fr:Colère en Louisiane
pt:A Gathering of Old Men